Thecla is a genus of butterflies, described by Johan Christian Fabricius in 1807, belonging to the family Lycaenidae. The species are found in the Palaearctic.

Species
Several, including:

 Thecla betulae (Linnaeus, 1758) - brown hairstreak
 Thecla betulina Staudinger, 1887
 Thecla ohyai Fujioka, 1994 China, Yunnan, Li-Kiang.
 Thecla chalybeia, De Nicéville 1892
 Thecla hemon (Cramer, 1775) formerly in the, then. wastebasket taxon "Thecla" sensu lato  = Theritas hemon Cramer, 1775
 Thecla leechii, De Nicéville 1892
 Thecla letha, (Watson, 1896) 
 Thecla pavo, (De Nicéville, 1887)
 Thecla ziha, (Hewitson, 1865)

References
Taxon profile at BioLib
"Thecla Fabricius, 1807" at Markku Savela's Lepidoptera and Some Other Life Forms

External links
Images representing Thecla at Consortium for the Barcode of Life

Theclini
 
Lycaenidae genera
Taxa named by Johan Christian Fabricius